Gustl Bayrhammer (12 February 1922 – 24 April 1993) was a German actor. He appeared in more than 70 films and television shows between 1964 and 1993. He starred in the 1970 film o.k., which was entered into the 20th Berlin International Film Festival. However, the competition was cancelled and no prizes were awarded, over controversy surrounding the film. He is mostly known for his role as Meister Eder in the 1980s children's show Meister Eder und sein Pumuckl.

Selected filmography
 o.k. (1970)
 Student of the Bedroom (1970)
 Mathias Kneissl (1970)
 Tatort (1971–1981, TV series), as Melchior Veigl
 The Sternstein Manor (1976)
  (1977)
  (1978, TV miniseries)
  (1982)
 Meister Eder und sein Pumuckl (1982–1989, TV series)
  (1983)
 Success (1991)
  (1993/94)

References

External links

1922 births
1993 deaths
German male film actors
German male television actors
Male actors from Munich
20th-century German male actors